Seeta (or Sita) Devi (1912–1983), born Renee Smith, was one of the early stars of silent films in the Indian film industry.

Career

Himanshu Rai cast Smith, an Anglo-Indian, in Prem Sanyas, the movie which is better known by its English title: The Light of Asia. This was her debut film as Seeta Devi, and it made her a star immediately. Later she acted under the banner of Madan Theatres as well.

Three of her most successful films were: The Light of Asia, Shiraz, and Prapancha Pash. All three of these films were made through the collaboration of German film director Franz Osten and Indian actor-producer Himanshu Rai along with Bavarian company Emelka. This unique trilogy were connected to three different religions and based on three different stories of Indian history/mythology: The Light of Asia was based on the life of Buddha, Shiraz was based on construction of the Taj Mahal and Prapancha Pash, better known by its English title A Throw of Dice, was based on a story from the Mahabharata. Seeta Devi was the leading actress in all these three films, though the role in Shiraz was that of 'the other woman'.

Three of her other successful films, Durgesh Nandini, Kapal Kundala and Krishnakanter Will were based on popular novels of Bankim Chandra Chatterjee.

Many believed that Renee Smith and her sister Percy Smith alternatively appeared as 'Seeta Devi'.

Filmography
 Prem Sanyas (1925) (German title: Die Leuchte Asiens, English title: The Light of Asia)
 Krishnakanter Will (1926)
 Durgesh Nandini (1927)
 Shiraz (1928) (German title: Das Grabmal einer großen Liebe)
 Sarala (1928) (Hindi title: Swarnalata)
 Loves of a Moghul Prince (1928) (Urdu title: Anarkali; also 'Rajmahal Ni Ramani')
 Bhrantri (1928) (English title: Mistake)
 Kapal Kundala (1929)
 Prapancha Pash (1929) (English title: A Throw of Dice, German title: Schicksalswürfel)
 Bharat Ramani (1930) (English title: The Enchantress of India)
 Kal Parinaya (1930) (English title: Fatal Marriage)

References

External links

 
 Website on re-release of A Throw of Dice
 Bengali article from abasar.net

1905 births
1983 deaths
Bengali actresses
Indian silent film actresses
Anglo-Indian people
Actresses of European descent in Indian films
People from British India
20th-century Indian actresses
Actresses from West Bengal